Stupino is the name of several inhabited localities in Russia.

Arkhangelsk Oblast
As of 2010, one rural locality in Arkhangelsk Oblast bears this name:
Stupino, Arkhangelsk Oblast, a village in Kopachevsky Selsoviet of Kholmogorsky District

Astrakhan Oblast
As of 2010, one rural locality in Astrakhan Oblast bears this name:
Stupino, Astrakhan Oblast, a selo in Stupino Selsoviet of Chernoyarsky District

Chelyabinsk Oblast
As of 2010, one rural locality in Chelyabinsk Oblast bears this name:
Stupino, Chelyabinsk Oblast, a village in Sarafanovsky Selsoviet of Chebarkulsky District

Ivanovo Oblast
As of 2010, two rural localities in Ivanovo Oblast bear this name:
Stupino, Furmanovsky District, Ivanovo Oblast, a village in Furmanovsky District
Stupino, Savinsky District, Ivanovo Oblast, a village in Savinsky District

Kaluga Oblast
As of 2010, one rural locality in Kaluga Oblast bears this name:
Stupino, Kaluga Oblast, a village in Medynsky District

Kostroma Oblast
As of 2010, two rural localities in Kostroma Oblast bear this name:
Stupino, Galichsky District, Kostroma Oblast, a village in Berezovskoye Settlement of Galichsky District
Stupino, Manturovsky District, Kostroma Oblast, a village in Ugorskoye Settlement of Manturovsky District

Lipetsk Oblast
As of 2010, one rural locality in Lipetsk Oblast bears this name:
Stupino, Lipetsk Oblast, a village in Speshnevo-Ivanovsky Selsoviet of Dankovsky District

Moscow Oblast
As of 2010, four inhabited localities in Moscow Oblast bear this name.

Urban localities
Stupino, Stupinsky District, Moscow Oblast, a town in Stupinsky District

Rural localities
Stupino, Domodedovo, Moscow Oblast, a village under the administrative jurisdiction of the Domodedovo Town Under Oblast Jurisdiction
Stupino, Dmitrovsky District, Moscow Oblast, a village in Kulikovskoye Rural Settlement of Dmitrovsky District
Stupino, Naro-Fominsky District, Moscow Oblast, a village in Volchenkovskoye Rural Settlement of Naro-Fominsky District

Nizhny Novgorod Oblast
As of 2010, two rural localities in Nizhny Novgorod Oblast bear this name:
Stupino, Chkalovsky District, Nizhny Novgorod Oblast, a village in Kuznetsovsky Selsoviet of Chkalovsky District
Stupino, Gorodetsky District, Nizhny Novgorod Oblast, a village in Zinyakovsky Selsoviet of Gorodetsky District

Pskov Oblast
As of 2010, five rural localities in Pskov Oblast bear this name:
Stupino, Kunyinsky District, Pskov Oblast, a village in Kunyinsky District
Stupino, Novorzhevsky District, Pskov Oblast, a village in Novorzhevsky District
Stupino, Opochetsky District, Pskov Oblast, a village in Opochetsky District
Stupino, Ostrovsky District, Pskov Oblast, a village in Ostrovsky District
Stupino, Pechorsky District, Pskov Oblast, a village in Pechorsky District

Tula Oblast
As of 2010, two rural localities in Tula Oblast bear this name:
Stupino, Aleksinsky District, Tula Oblast, a village in Spas-Koninsky Rural Okrug of Aleksinsky District
Stupino, Yefremovsky District, Tula Oblast, a selo in Stupinsky Rural Okrug of Yefremovsky District

Tver Oblast
As of 2010, two rural localities in Tver Oblast bear this name:
Stupino, Selizharovsky District, Tver Oblast, a village in Selizharovsky District
Stupino, Zubtsovsky District, Tver Oblast, a village in Zubtsovsky District

Vladimir Oblast
As of 2010, one rural locality in Vladimir Oblast bears this name:
Stupino, Vladimir Oblast, a village in Kameshkovsky District

Vologda Oblast
As of 2010, two rural localities in Vologda Oblast bear this name:
Stupino, Abakanovsky Selsoviet, Cherepovetsky District, Vologda Oblast, a village in Abakanovsky Selsoviet of Cherepovetsky District
Stupino, Bolshedvorsky Selsoviet, Cherepovetsky District, Vologda Oblast, a village in Bolshedvorsky Selsoviet of Cherepovetsky District

Voronezh Oblast
As of 2010, two rural localities in Voronezh Oblast bear this name:
Stupino, Pavlovsky District, Voronezh Oblast, a khutor in Pokrovskoye Rural Settlement of Pavlovsky District
Stupino, Ramonsky District, Voronezh Oblast, a selo in Stupinskoye Rural Settlement of Ramonsky District

Yaroslavl Oblast
As of 2010, two rural localities in Yaroslavl Oblast bear this name:
Stupino, Bolsheselsky District, Yaroslavl Oblast, a village in Blagoveshchensky Rural Okrug of Bolsheselsky District
Stupino, Myshkinsky District, Yaroslavl Oblast, a village in Arkhangelsky Rural Okrug of Myshkinsky District